Qara Kola (also Romanized as Qarā Kolā; also known as Qūrā Kolā) is a village in Dabuy-ye Jonubi Rural District, Dabudasht District, Amol County, Mazandaran Province, Iran. At the 2006 census, its population was 321, in 88 families.

References 

Populated places in Amol County